Highway 55, commonly referred to as Irbid-Ajloun Highway is a north–south highway in Northwestern Jordan. It connects the two cities of Irbid and Ajloun, as is mentioned in the name.

See also
Itinerary of the highway on Google Maps

Roads in Jordan